Max Holden is a fictional character from the American soap opera One Life to Live.  The role was originated by James DePaiva.

Casting
Actor James DePaiva originated the role of Max Holden on the series episode first-run January 6, 1987, leaving the role in February 23, 1990. The character was then recast with Nicholas Walker in a plastic surgery storyline (see "Larry Wolek") in March 5 of that year. DePaiva returned to the series on October 25, 1991, with no mention made of the character's return to his previous appearance, portraying Max through the character's on-air departure on October 27, 2003; he briefly returned for episodes from August 17 through August 20, 2007, for the on-screen funeral of lead character Asa Buchanan (Philip Carey).

Storylines

Romances and family
Max Holden arrives to Llanview in 1987 to seek a loan from fellow Texan and family friend Maria Roberts (BarBara Luna), who agreed to give him the money he needed on the condition that Max lure Tina Lord (Andrea Evans) away from her son, Cord (John Loprieno). Max soon falls for Tina, while she was still in love with Cord. While Max and Tina are marrying in ceremony, she accidentally says Cord's name during her vows, and Max then calls off his relationship with her. Max's brother Steve Holden (Russ Anderson) comes to town in 1987 and soon becomes involved with and marries Gabrielle Medina (Fiona Hutchison), Max's ex-girlfriend and mother to his son, Al. Gabrielle still cares for Max, however, and the relationship with Steve falls apart in 1988. Later in 1988, at the double wedding of Cord and Tina and Asa and Renée Divine (Patricia Elliott), Steve notices that the wedding cake has been wired to explode. Steve throws himself in front to the bomb and is killed when it explodes.

Max falls in love in 1991 with Luna Moody (Susan Batten), with whom he would have twin children, son Francis Thomas and daughter Leslie Diana. During his marriage, Max engages in a torrid affair in 1993 and 1994 with Blair Cramer (Kassie DePaiva), who had previously married Asa in a marriage of convenience. Luna is killed in 1995, leaving Max widowed. Max goes on to enjoy relationships with Maggie Carpenter, as well as a reunion and marriage with Blair and a fling with Kelly Cramer (Gina Tognoni). He also reunites with Gabrielle, but it does not last. From 1999 to 2001, he pretends to be the son of Asa and Renee before being exposed by Todd Manning. In 2002, in a drunken Las Vegas escapade, he awakes to find himself married to Roxy Balsom (Ilene Kristen), a union that quickly fizzles.

When son Al dies of liver failure in the fall of 2003, at the advice of Luna's spirit, Max leaves Llanview to be with his and Luna's twins Frank and Leslie in North Carolina. Max returns in August 2007 for the funeral of Asa and reveals that he, Frank, and Leslie are all living in Gabrielle's home country of Argentina. He invites Blair to join him there and kisses her, unaware of her continuing passion for Todd Manning. Blair gently rebuffs him. Wishing his best to Blair, Max returns to Argentina.

References

External links
 James DePaiva as Max Holden – ABC.com (archived)
 Max Holden profile – SoapCentral.com
 Max Holden profile – The Llanview Labyrinth

One Life to Live characters
Television characters introduced in 1987
Fictional businesspeople
Fictional characters from Texas
American male characters in television